The Molinex Trophy is awarded annually to the women's rugby union champions of U Sports, Canada's governing body for university sports. The first women's rugby union championship was held in November 1998. The tournament features eight teams playing in a single-elimination format, which takes place over four days and features 11 games at a single, pre-determined host site. The trophy was donated by Molinex Sports, the official Canadian distributor of Gilbert Rugby balls. The 2020 championship tournament was cancelled due to the COVID-19 pandemic.

Champions
1998 - University of Guelph Gryphons
1999 - University of Alberta Pandas
2000 - University of Alberta Pandas
2001 - University of Alberta Pandas
2002 - University of Alberta Pandas
2003 - University of Alberta Pandas
2004 - University of Western Ontario Mustangs
2005 - University of Western Ontario Mustangs
2006 - St. Francis Xavier University X-Women
2007 - University of Lethbridge Pronghorns
2008 - University of Lethbridge Pronghorns
2009 - University of Lethbridge Pronghorns
2010 - St. Francis Xavier University X-Women
2011 - University of Guelph Gryphons
2012 - St. Francis Xavier University X-Women
2013 - University of Alberta Pandas
2014 - St. Francis Xavier University X-Women
2015 - McMaster University Marauders
2016 - St. Francis Xavier University X-Women
2017 - University of Ottawa Gee-Gees
2018 - St. Francis Xavier University X-Women
2019 - Université Laval Rouge et Or
2020 - Cancelled due to the COVID-19 pandemic
2021 - Queen's University Gaels
2022 - Université Laval Rouge et Or

References

External links
U Sports Rugby Championship

U Sports trophies
Women's rugby union competitions in Canada